was a Japanese artist and pioneering photographer. Originally from Kiryū, in what is now Gunma Prefecture, she studied at an art school in Edo (now Tokyo) where she met Shima Kakoku (1827–1870), a fellow student. The two married in 1855 and soon began moving about the Kantō region, possibly exhibiting their works along the way.

At some point the couple learned photography, and in the spring of 1864 Ryū photographed her husband, thereby creating the earliest known photograph by a Japanese woman.
The negative is on deposit at the Tojo Historical Museum, a wet-plate print of this portrait remains in the Shima family archives and the Museum of Fine Arts in Houston has an albumen print.

The Shimas operated a photographic studio in Edo in about 1865 to 1867, until Kakoku accepted a teaching position at Kaiseijo. Following her husband's death in 1870, Ryū returned to Kiryū where she opened her own studio. She died in 1900.

References 

1823 births
1900 deaths
Pioneers of photography
Portrait photographers
People of Meiji-period Japan
People from Gunma Prefecture
Japanese photographers
Japanese women photographers
19th-century women photographers